In enzymology, an acetyl-CoA C-acetyltransferase is an enzyme that catalyzes the chemical reaction

2 acetyl-CoA  CoA + acetoacetyl-CoA

Hence, this enzyme has one substrate, acetyl-CoA, and two products, CoA and acetoacetyl-CoA.

Acetyl-CoA C-acetyltransferase belongs to the thiolase family of enzymes.

This enzyme belongs to the family of transferases, specifically those acyltransferases transferring groups other than aminoacyl groups.  The systematic name of this enzyme class is acetyl-CoA:acetyl-CoA C-acetyltransferase. Other names in common use include acetoacetyl-CoA thiolase, beta-acetoacetyl coenzyme A thiolase, 2-methylacetoacetyl-CoA thiolase [misleading], 3-oxothiolase, acetyl coenzyme A thiolase, acetyl-CoA acetyltransferase, acetyl-CoA:N-acetyltransferase, and thiolase II.  This enzyme participates in 10 metabolic pathways: fatty acid metabolism, synthesis and degradation of ketone bodies, valine, leucine and isoleucine degradation, lysine degradation, tryptophan metabolism, pyruvate metabolism, benzoate degradation via coa ligation, propanoate metabolism, butanoate metabolism, and two-component system - general.

Isozymes 

Human genes encoding acetyl-CoA C-acetyltransferases include:

References

Further reading 

 
 

EC 2.3.1
Enzymes of known structure